Horace Boardman Smith (August 18, 1826 – December 26, 1888) was a U.S. Representative from New York.

Born in Whitingham, Vermont, Smith pursued classical studies and was graduated from Williams College, Williamstown, Massachusetts, in 1847.
He studied law.
He was admitted to the bar in 1850 and began practice in Elmira, New York.
Held several local offices.
He served as judge of Chemung County in 1859 and 1860.

Smith was elected as a Republican to the Forty-second and Forty-third Congresses (March 4, 1871 – March 3, 1875).
He served as chairman of the Committee on Elections (Forty-third Congress).
He was not a candidate for renomination in 1874.
He resumed the practice of law in Elmira, New York, until 1883.
He served as justice of the supreme court of New York State 1883-1888.
He retired to his home at Elmira, where he died on December 26, 1888.
He was interred in Woodlawn Cemetery.

Sources

1826 births
1888 deaths
People from Whitingham, Vermont
Republican Party members of the United States House of Representatives from New York (state)
Williams College alumni
19th-century American politicians